Merle "Mimsy" Farmer (born February 28, 1945) is a former American actress, artist and sculptor. She began her career appearing in several Hollywood studio films, such as Spencer's Mountain (1963) and Bus Riley's Back in Town (1965), followed by roles in the exploitation films Devil's Angels and Riot on Sunset Strip (both 1967).

Farmer went on to establish herself as an international performer, starring in numerous European films, including the dramas More (1969) and Strogoff (1970), as well as multiple Italian giallo films: Dario Argento's  Four Flies on Grey Velvet (1971), The Perfume of the Lady in Black (1974), Autopsy (1975), and Lucio Fulci's The Black Cat (1981).

Early years
Farmer was born Merle Farmer on February 28, 1945, in Chicago, Illinois. Her father was a news reporter for the Chicago Tribune and a writer for radio. Her mother was French. Her nickname, which she later took as her stage name, is derived from a line in Lewis Carroll's Jabberwocky: "All mimsy were the borogoves".

When she was four years old, her family relocated to Los Angeles, California, where she was raised. Farmer graduated from Hollywood High School in 1962. Her early experience as an entertainer came in her role of handling rabbits for a magician who performed at children's birthday parties. As a teenager, Farmer also worked as a concession cashier and theater usherette at the Cinerama Dome in Los Angeles.

Career

Farmer acted in Spencer's Mountain (1963) and More (1969). After a brief film career in the United States, mostly portraying party-girl types in films such as Hot Rods to Hell (1967), Riot on Sunset Strip (1967), and The Wild Racers (1968), Farmer moved to Italy. Most of her acting career has been in Europe, with roles in gialli such as Four Flies on Grey Velvet by Dario Argento, The Black Cat by Lucio Fulci and The Perfume of the Lady in Black by Francesco Barilli.

In 1962 and 1963, respectively, Farmer guest-starred as Laurie in "The Swingin' Set" and as Joanne Wells in "Boys and Girls" on the sitcom The Donna Reed Show.

She made two guest appearances on Perry Mason in 1964, including the role of defendant Kathy Anders in "The Case of the Tragic Trophy" and as Sande Lukins in "The Case of the Careless Kidnapper". She appeared on My Three Sons, Honey West, The Adventures of Ozzie and Harriet, The Outer Limits (March 2, 1964, episode "Second Chance") and The F.B.I.

In 1966, she appeared as Lorrie Thatcher in the episode "The Calico Kid" and as Antonia in the episode "A Prince of a Ranger" on Laredo.

In 1971, Farmer won a special David di Donatello film award for acting for her performance in The Road to Salina (1970).

Since 1992, she has worked as a sculptor for theatre and opera in France and Italy, and for films such as Oceans, Troy, Charlie and the Chocolate Factory, Marie Antoinette, Five Children and It, The Golden Compass, Pirates of the Caribbean: On Stranger Tides, Wrath of the Titans, Guardians of the Galaxy,  and Beauty and the Beast.

She also creates personal sculptures and paintings.

Filmography

Television

Awards

References

External links

Living people
20th-century American actresses
20th-century American sculptors
20th-century American women artists
21st-century American sculptors
21st-century American women artists
Actresses from Chicago
Actresses from Los Angeles
American film actresses
American television actresses
American women sculptors
Artists from Chicago
Artists from Los Angeles
David di Donatello winners
Hollywood High School alumni
Sculptors from California
Sculptors from Illinois
1945 births